The Greek-Serbian Symposium is a joint conference on Balkan studies, specialized in Greek-Serbian relations, held by the Greek Institute for Balkan Studies (IMXA) in Thessaloniki and Serbian Institute for Balkan Studies of the Serbian Academy of Sciences and Arts (SANU) in Belgrade, since 1976. The collections of reports from the conferences are published by the institutes. It was agreed after the second symposium that the reports were to be published in world languages.

Symposiums

External links

Greece–Serbia relations
1976 in Greece
1980 in Serbia
1982 in Greece
1985 in Serbia
1987 in Greece
2003 in Greece
Balkan studies
Recurring events established in 1976
Academic conferences